Conomitra  is a genus of plant in the family Apocynaceae first described in 1839. It contains only one known species, Conomitra linearis, native to Africa, from Niger to Somalia.

References

Asclepiadoideae
Flora of Niger
Flora of Northeast Tropical Africa
Flora of Kenya
Taxa named by Eduard Fenzl